The Red Wing Manufacturers were a Minnesota–Wisconsin League minor league baseball team based in Red Wing, Minnesota that played from 1910 to 1911. It is the only known professional team to ever play in Red Wing. Major league players Joe Fautsch and Frank Gregory played for the team.

References

Baseball teams established in 1910
Defunct minor league baseball teams
Red Wing, Minnesota
Professional baseball teams in Minnesota
Sports clubs disestablished in 1911
1910 establishments in Minnesota
1911 disestablishments in Minnesota
Defunct baseball teams in Minnesota
Baseball teams disestablished in 1911
Minnesota-Wisconsin League teams